Chenopodium leptophyllum is a species of flowering plant in the family Amaranthaceae known by the common name narrowleaf goosefoot.

It is native to much of western North America, where it is reported from Alaska to Texas and northern Mexico, and into central Canada. It can be found in many types of open habitat, often in sandy and gravelly soils, and it grows easily in disturbed areas such as roadsides.

Description
It is an erect or mostly erect annual herb approaching 40 to 60 centimeters in maximum height. It is powdery in texture, especially on the undersides of the leaves. The thin, dusty leaf is linear to narrowly lance-shaped, smooth along the edges, and up to about 2.5 centimeters in length.

The inflorescences are located at the tips of branches and in the leaf axils. They are arrays of clusters of tightly packed, tiny flowers. Each flower has five lobes in its corolla.

Uses
Among the Zuni people, the young plants boiled alone or with meat and used for food. The ground seeds are mixed with corn meal and salt, made into a stiff batter, formed into balls and steamed. The seeds are to be considered among the most important food plants when the Zuni reached this world.

References

External links

Jepson Manual Treatment
USDA Plants Profile
Flora of North America

leptophyllum
Flora of the Western United States
Flora of the Canadian Prairies
Flora of the United States
Flora of the Rocky Mountains
Flora of Ontario
Flora of the Sierra Nevada (United States)
Flora of the California desert regions
Flora of New Jersey
Plants used in Native American cuisine
Flora of North America
Flora without expected TNC conservation status